Jill is a Dutch television program which is broadcast by AVROTROS on the channel NPO Zapp. The presenter is Jill Schirnhofer.

The program 
On this program the presenter Jill Schirnhofer gives tips and tricks for the watcher on drawing, crafts, fashion and cooking.

Dutch television shows
NPO 3 original programming